Sapmaan go Waisammo? or One Hundred Thousand Whys? (十萬個為什麼) is a 1993 Cantonese album recorded by Chinese Cantopop singer Faye Wong as 王靖雯 Wong Ching Man, when she was based in Hong Kong. It is named after a popular Chinese science book, One Hundred Thousand Whys by Ye Yonglie.

The album included several hit singles: "Flow Not Fly", "Summer Of Love", "Like Wind", "Cold War", "Tempted Heart" and "Tempt Me".

"Flow Not Fly", a lively pop number, became an unofficial anthem for Faye Wong, with the repeated chorus line "Fei Fei" being a pun on the singer's name.

"Cold War" is a Cantonese cover of "Silent All These Years" by Tori Amos; a Mandarin version followed on Mystery. The song was a departure from mainstream C-pop, and Wong followed this markedly with further experiments in "alternative music" for her next Cantonese album, Random Thoughts.

The album included four more cover songs. "Summer of Love" is the Cantonese version of Helen Hoffner's 1993 hit. "Like Wind" is a cover of the Mandarin song 猜心 ("Guess my Heart") by One-Fang. "Rainy Days Without You" covers Love Unlimited's "Walking in the Rain (With The One I Love)", and "Do Do Da Da" is The Police's "De Do Do Do, De Da Da Da".

"Do We Really Care" was Faye Wong's second song recorded wholly in English, after "Kisses in the Wind" on Coming Home.

The Japanese version of the album released in April 1994 included three bonus tracks: another version of "Like Wind", a Mandarin version of "Fragile Woman" (from Coming Home), and "Forgetting You Is Like Forgetting Me", the theme from The Bride with White Hair 2.

"Tempted Heart" was the theme for the TVB series Eternity, in which Wong also appeared. "Tempt Me" was the theme tune for Joan Chen's 1993 film Temptation of a Monk, and won a Best Movie Song award.

Wong's 1994-95 series of concerts at the Hong Kong Coliseum included five songs from the album: the first four, and "Tempt Me" which was extended with a prelude.

Track listing

Yu fung

"如風 Autumn Version" (Yu fung) – "Like Wind (Autumn Version)"
"诱惑我" – Tempted Heart (You Huo Wo)
"天生不是情造" – Innately Not Made of Love (Tin sang bat si tsing jo)
"季候风" - Seasonal Gale (Gwai Hau Fung)

References

External links
Hundred Thousand Whys at Joshua Cheung's fan site
100.000 Why's at All Ah About Faye

1993 albums
Faye Wong albums
Cinepoly Records albums
Cantonese-language albums
Cantopop albums